The following is an alphabetical list of topics related to the British Overseas Territory of the Cayman Islands.



0–9

.ky – Internet country code top-level domain for the Cayman Islands
1932 Cuba Hurricane

A
Airports in the Cayman Islands
Americas
North America
North Atlantic Ocean
West Indies
Caribbean Sea
Antilles
Lesser Antilles
Cayman Islands
Anglo-America
Antilles
Atlas of the Cayman Islands

B
Birds of the Cayman Islands
British Overseas Territory of the Cayman Islands

C
Capital of the Cayman Islands:  George Town on Grand Cayman
Caribbean
Caribbean Community (CARICOM)
Caribbean Sea
Categories:
:Category:Cayman Islands
:Category:Buildings and structures in the Cayman Islands
:Category:Cayman Islands law
:Category:Cayman Islands-related lists
:Category:Caymanian culture
:Category:Caymanian people
:Category:Communications in the Cayman Islands
:Category:Economy of the Cayman Islands
:Category:Education in the Cayman Islands
:Category:Environment of the Cayman Islands
:Category:Geography of the Cayman Islands
:Category:Government of the Cayman Islands
:Category:Health in the Cayman Islands
:Category:History of the Cayman Islands

:Category:Politics of the Cayman Islands
:Category:Society of the Cayman Islands
:Category:Sport in the Cayman Islands
:Category:Transport in the Cayman Islands
commons:Category:Cayman Islands
Cayman Brac
Cayman Islands
Cayman Islands at the Olympics
Cayman Islands national football team
Cayman Islands Stock Exchange
Cayman Motor Museum
Chief Justice of the Cayman Islands
Cities in the Cayman Islands
Climate of the Cayman Islands
Coat of arms of the Cayman Islands
Commonwealth of Nations
Communications in the Cayman Islands
Culture of the Cayman Islands

D
Demographics of the Cayman Islands

E
Economy of the Cayman Islands
Education in the Cayman Islands
Elections in the Cayman Islands
English colonization of the Americas
English language

F

Flag of the Cayman Islands
Foreign relations of the Cayman Islands

G
Geography of the Cayman Islands
George Town on Grand Cayman – Capital of the Cayman Islands
Government of the Cayman Islands
Grand Cayman
Gross domestic product

H
History of the Cayman Islands
Hurricane Ivan

I
International Organization for Standardization (ISO)
ISO 3166-1 alpha-2 country code for the Cayman Islands: KY
ISO 3166-1 alpha-3 country code for the Cayman Islands: CYM
Internet in the Cayman Islands
Islands of the Cayman Islands:
Grand Cayman
Barkers Cay
Booby Cay
Duck Pond Cay
Finger Cay (now absorbed into Grand Cayman)
Sand Cay
Water Cay (now absorbed into Grand Cayman)
Little Cayman
Owen Island
Cayman Brac

L
Languages of the Cayman Islands
Law enforcement in the Cayman Islands
Law of the Cayman Islands
Lesser Antilles
LGBT rights in the Cayman Islands
Little Cayman
Lists related to the Cayman Islands:
List of airports in the Cayman Islands
List of birds of the Cayman Islands
List of Cayman Islands-related topics
List of cities in the Cayman Islands
List of countries by GDP (nominal)
List of islands of the Cayman Islands
List of mammals in the Cayman Islands
List of people on stamps of the Cayman Islands
List of political parties in the Cayman Islands
List of radio stations in Cayman Islands
List of schools in the Cayman Islands

M
Mammals in the Cayman Islands
Military of the Cayman Islands
Music of the Cayman Islands

N
North America
Northern Hemisphere

O
Offshore financial centre

P
People on stamps of the Cayman Islands
Politics of the Cayman Islands
List of political parties in the Cayman Islands

R
Radio stations in Cayman Islands
Rugby union in the Cayman Islands

S
The Scout Association of the Cayman Islands
Scuba diving in the Cayman Islands

T
Topic outline of the Cayman Islands
Transport in the Cayman Islands
Tropics

U
United Kingdom of Great Britain and Northern Ireland

W
West Indies
Western Hemisphere

Wikipedia:WikiProject Topic outline/Drafts/Topic outline of the Cayman Islands

See also

List of Caribbean-related topics
List of international rankings
Lists of country-related topics
Topic outline of geography
Topic outline of North America
Topic outline of the Cayman Islands

References

External links

 
Cayman Islands